Frank Stephenson is an American retired ice hockey goaltender who was one of the first two All-Americans for Colby College in 1962.

Career
Stephenson was a three-year varsity player for Colby. Entering his senior season, Colby joined with 27 other eastern schools to form ECAC Hockey. While the Mules weren't considered a threat by many of the traditional eastern powers, Colby ended up winning the inaugural regular season championship by going 17–1–1 in conference play. The shocking finish earned Stephenson a place on the All-ECAC First Team as well as a nod as an All-American. Colby was seeded third in the ECAC Tournament (seedings were arranged based upon rankings and not conference standings) and they won their opening match against Rensselaer. The team's offense faltered in the semifinal against Clarkson and remained dormant in the third place game, preventing Colby from making an almost unthinkable appearance in the NCAA Tournament.

Awards and honors

References

External links

1940 births
Living people
American ice hockey goaltenders
Ice hockey people from New Hampshire
People from Plymouth, New Hampshire
Colby College alumni
AHCA Division I men's ice hockey All-Americans